Wera Tools is the popular name for tool manufacturer Wera Werkzeuge GmbH (formally   Wera Werk Hermann Werner GmbH & Co KG) of Wuppertal, Germany. It was founded in 1936. Wera Tools is known for its slogan “Be A Tool Rebel” which can be found on the packaging of many of their products.

Corporate structure 
Wera Tools is a global screwdriving tool manufacturer.  Its global headquarters and European sales team is based in Wuppertal, Germany. Wera has two wholly owned regional subsidiaries: in the United Kingdom (based in Chesterfield, Derbyshire, England) and North America (based in Ontario, Canada), where it is known as Wera Tools Inc. Outside of these areas, the company operates through a network of sales agents and wholesalers. Wera is a privately held company and employs more than 750 people. The company was fully acquired in 2016 by Bitburger Holding.

Wera Tools designs and manufactures more than 3,000 tools for both manual and power tool applications at its German headquarters and its factories in the Czech Republic and in Taïwan.

Product categories and brands 
Wera products include screwdrivers, screwdriver bits, ratchets and sockets, nut-spinners and L-keys. Wera tools are used principally by professionals, including builders, electricians, and mechanics.

Wera is known for its line of screwdrivers featuring the distinctive Kraftform shape handle. This design is based around the contours of the hand during screwdriver use, and uses a specifically designed combination of ergonomic soft zones and smooth, hard zones. The distinctive 'crowns' from this handle are used as part of the Wera logo.

Other key Wera developments and well-known brands include:

Joker Ratchet spanners with a nut holding feature 
 IMPAKTOR screwdriver bit system for cordless impact drivers, utilising TriTorsion and Diamond technology for longer life
 BiTorsion screwdriver bits
 Rapidaptor bit holders
 The Hex-Plus screw profile (prevents rounding out when compared with the traditional hex profile)
 Zyklop multi-function ratchet and sockets
 The Koloss, a ratchet that can also be used as a hammer
 The Chiseldriver, a screwdriver that can be used as a chisel and hit with a hammer whilst remaining fully usable as a precision screwdriver
 Kraftform Kompakt tools, kits consisting of bit holders or bit-holding handles and a selection of screwdriver bits or blades, supplied in a hard case or soft belt pouch
 Wera Stainless, a range of tools manufactured from stainless steel that is tough enough to be used in tough industrial and commercial applications, thanks to a unique manufacturing process. This range solves several aesthetic and material problems associated with using conventional (carbon) steel tools with stainless steel fixings and fasteners.

Awards

Design Award Winner:

Product Design:
 1997, 2009, 2012 and 2013: (Discipline Product): iF Product Design Award
 2015 (Discipline Packaging): iF Product Design Award
 2015 (Discipline Packaging - gold): iF Product Design Award
 2010: red dot design award
 2014: red dot design award 

Communication Design:
 2014: red dot design award 
 2015. German Design Award

Award for innovation:
 2007:  Top Innovator.

References

External links 
  (German)
 Official UK website
 Official North American website

German brands
Companies based in North Rhine-Westphalia
Manufacturing companies established in 1936
Tool manufacturing companies of Germany
Automotive tool manufacturers
Fastening tool manufacturers
Multi-tool manufacturers
Tool brands
Torque tool manufacturers
German companies established in 1936
Wuppertal